Peer Pleasure is an album by saxophonist Jimmy Heath featuring performances recorded in 1987 and released on the Landmark label.

Reception

Scott Yanow at Allmusic noted "Jimmy Heath (60 at the time) shows that he was still very much in prime form".

Track listing
All compositions by Jimmy Heath except where noted
 "Trane Connections" - 7:22   
 "Song for Ben Webster" (Ernie Wilkins) - 6:13   
 "You Can See" (Monty Alexander) - 6:57   
 "Is That So?" (Duke Pearson) - 5:58   
 "Ellington's Stray Horn" - 6:26   
 "Forever Sonny" - 7:58   
 "I Waited for You" (Dizzy Gillespie) - 6:38

Personnel
Jimmy Heath - tenor saxophone, alto saxophone, soprano saxophone
Tom Williams - trumpet, flugelhorn
Tony Purrone - guitar
Larry Willis - piano
Stafford James - bass
Akira Tana - drums

References

Landmark Records albums
Jimmy Heath albums
1987 albums
Albums produced by Orrin Keepnews
Albums recorded at Van Gelder Studio